Wanihama is a village in tehsil Beerwah, district Budgam of the Jammu and Kashmir (India).

References 

Villages in Budgam district